Claire Alexandra Styron known as Alexandra Styron, is an American author and professor.

Early life and education 
Styron is the youngest child of author William Styron and poet and human rights activist Rose Burgunder. She grew up in Roxbury, Connecticut, and in Martha’s Vineyard. Styron attended Barnard College, and later the MFA Creative Writing program at Columbia University.

Career 
After a brief stint as an actress, Styron turned to writing and is the author of several books. Her most-noted work, 2011 memoir Reading My Father, detailed her life growing up with the Pulitzer Prize-winning novelist and explored his decades-long struggle with major clinical depression. The book was published by Scribner to strong reviews. In The New York Times Book Review, James Campbell described the book as “brilliant and shocking.” Reading My Father was nominated for the L.A. Times book award and long-listed for The New York Times bestseller list.

Styron is a professor in the MFA Creative Writing program at Hunter College in New York City.

Selected works 

 All The Finest Girls (2001), a novel;
 Reading My Father (2011), a memoir about her father, author William Styron;
 Steal This Country: A Handbook for Resistance, Persistence, and Fixing (Almost) Everything (2018), a young adult guide to activism.

References

External links 

Living people
20th-century American women writers
21st-century American women writers
20th-century American actresses
People from Roxbury, Connecticut
People from Martha's Vineyard, Massachusetts
Barnard College alumni
Columbia University School of the Arts alumni
Hunter College faculty
Year of birth missing (living people)